Fantaye Sirak (born 17 December 1963) is an Ethiopian middle-distance runner. She competed in the women's 800 metres at the 1980 Summer Olympics. She was the first woman to represent Ethiopia at the Olympics.

References

External links
 

1963 births
Living people
Athletes (track and field) at the 1980 Summer Olympics
Ethiopian female middle-distance runners
Olympic athletes of Ethiopia
Place of birth missing (living people)
20th-century Ethiopian women
21st-century Ethiopian women